Bheemante Vazhi is a 2021 Indian Malayalam-language comedy drama film directed by Ashraf Hamza and written by Chemban Vinod Jose. It stars Kunchacko Boban and Megha Thomas, with Jose, Jinu Joseph, Naseer Sankranthi, Divya M Nair and Chinnu Chandni in supporting roles. Vishnu Vijay composed the original songs and background score. Chemban Vinod Jose produced the film under Chembosky Motion Pictures in association with Rima Kallingal-Aashiq Abu's OPM Cinemas. The film received positive reviews from critics.

Plot
The story of Bheemante Vazhi takes place in a neighbourhood where 20 families reside along a dilapidated road next to a railway track. Everything takes an interesting turn when he decides to broaden the pathway.

Bheeman, key protagonist of this movie, plans to broaden the pathway and starts coordinating with other people of that area. Everyone agrees to give up some part of their land for making road. But they faced hurdle of getting the buy-in from two people, Dr. Simon  and Kostheppu. They would not get any benefit out of this road as they stay at the entrance of that area but had to give up some part of land for larger cause. Dr. Simon was convinced. However, Kostheppu, a man with nefarious plans, wants to make use of this situation to mint money. Bheeman tries all possible means of success.

Cast

 Kunchacko Boban as Sanjeev Shankar (Sanju)  Bheeman
 Jinu Joseph as Oothampilly Kostheppu
 Chemban Vinod Jose as Maharshi
 Divya M Nair as Councilor Reetha
 Megha Thomas as Kinnari
 Naseer Sankranthi as Gulaan Paul
 Arya Salim as Advocate Deepa
 Chinnu Chandni as Anju Chandran
 Vincy Aloshious as Blessy Paul
 Jeeva Janardhanan as Sita
 Suraj Venjaramoodu as Manjali Tarseus
 Binu Pappu as Krishnadas (Dasan)
 Bhagath Manuel as Oothampilly Caspar
 Shabareesh Varma as Vivek Guddali Tachisthu
 Ashvin Mathew as Dr. Cedric Simon Athikuntham
 Shiny Sarah as Sanju's Mother
 Nirmal Palazhi as Manilal
 Anand Bal as Anju's brother

Production
Principal photography of the film began in December 2020 at Perassanur, Kuttipuram, Malappuram district, following COVID-19 protocols. This is Chemban Vinod's second script after Angamaly Diaries. Thamaasha fame Chinnu Chandni was roped in to play one of the female leads in the film. The filming completed in February 2021 and expected an April release, but has been delayed.

Music 

The original soundtrack is composed, programmed, and arranged by Vishnu Vijay with lyrics penned by Muhsin Parari.

Release
The movie was first projected to release in April 2021, but was postponed due to COVID-19 pandemic in India. The film was released in theatres on 3 December 2021. After four weeks of theatrical run, the film was released in Amazon Prime Video on 30 December 2021.

Reception

Critical response 
Anna Mathews in their review for The Times of India, gave the film a 3.5/5 rating and stated: "Bheemante Vazhi is a sweet entertainer that audiences will enjoy, thanks to characters and situations they can identify with and laugh over."

Arun George of OnManorama gave the film a 3/5 rating in their review titled "Kunchacko Boban's Bheemante Vazhi cuts a predictable path into an everyday issue..."

In their review for Cinema Express, Sajin Shrijith described the film as a "lighthearted drama elevated by some clever moments" and states that "the film makes up for whatever shortcomings it has in the few highs accompanying the second and third acts."

References

External links
 

2021 comedy-drama films
Indian comedy-drama films
2020s Malayalam-language films